The 1990 NCAA Men's Water Polo Championship was the 22nd annual NCAA Men's Water Polo Championship to determine the national champion of NCAA men's collegiate water polo. Tournament matches were played at the Belmont Plaza Pool in Long Beach, California during December 1990.

California defeated Stanford in the final, 8–7, to win their ninth national title. Coached by Steve Heaston, the Golden Bears finished the season 29–1.

The Most Outstanding Player of the tournament was Chris Humbert (California). Humbert, along with six other players, was named to the All-Tournament Team.

The tournament's leading scorer, with 10 goals, was Lucas Nicolao from Navy.

Qualification
Since there has only ever been one single national championship for water polo, all NCAA men's water polo programs (whether from Division I, Division II, or Division III) were eligible. A total of 8 teams were invited to contest this championship.

Bracket
Site: Belmont Plaza Pool, Long Beach, California

All-tournament team 
Chris Humbert, California (Most outstanding player)
Julian Bailey, California
 Geoffrey Clark, Pepperdine
Dan Hackett, UCLA
Colin Keely, Stanford
Rick McNair, Stanford
Stefan Pollmann, UCLA

See also 
 NCAA Men's Water Polo Championship

References

NCAA Men's Water Polo Championship
NCAA Men's Water Polo Championship
1990 in sports in California
December 1990 sports events in the United States
1990